The EMD GM GT18LC-2 diesel electric locomotive was introduced by Electro-Motive Diesel as an export model switcher in the 1970s. The prototype model spent its life at the General Motors plant in London, Ontario and inspired sales to Egypt (which then canceled their order) and later Malaysia's Keretapi Tanah Melayu (KTM) in 1980 where it was designated KTM Class 25. KTM had been facing a shortage of shunters at that time. The prototype was eventually sold with another eleven more units to KTM in 1990 and after seeing the locomotives' reliability, placed a second order of five locomotives which arrived in 2002.

During KTM's second order of the GT18LC-2, Ghana Railway also placed an order for 14 locomotives of the same model which arrived in 1996.

Original Owners

References

G18TLC-2
C-C locomotives
Diesel-electric locomotives of Malaysia
Diesel-electric locomotives of Ghana
Metre gauge diesel locomotives